Vitaliano Donati (8 September 1717 – 26 February 1762), born in Padua in Italy, was an Italian doctor, archeologist, and botanist. He took the degree of Doctor of Philosophy in 1739.

He was interested in the flora and fauna of the Adriatic, and in 1745 he published Della storia naturale marina dell'Adriatico. This work was translated into many European languages. 

In 1750 Charles Emmanuel III, king of Sardinia, offered him a chair of Botany and Natural history at the University of Turin. During his career as a professor, he also occupied the chair of Mineralogy and Geology. He occupied the chair of Orto Botanico dell'Università di Torino from 1750 until his death. 

In 1757, Donati was elected a foreign member of the Royal Swedish Academy of Sciences and a Fellow of the Royal Society.

In 1759 he visited Egypt, Syria, Palestine, Arabia. He died on 26 February 1762 in the Indian Ocean, travelling on a Turkish ship to Mangalore in India.

The Italian city of Torino has entitled a street to Vitaliano Donati.

Works 

 Della storia naturale marina dell'Adriatico, (1745).
 Viaggio mineralogico nella Alpi occidentali di Vitaliano Donati a cura di Giuse Scalva, ed. Editrice Compositori per l'Istituto Nazionale per la Ricerca sulla Montagna di Roma (INRM).

See also 
 Lectionary 300

Bibliography 
 Scheda su Vitaliano Donati sul 
 Portale di storia della scienza.

References 

1717 births
1762 deaths
Physicians from Padua
18th-century Italian botanists
Italian archaeologists
Members of the Royal Swedish Academy of Sciences
Fellows of the Royal Society
Scientists from Padua